Bonnefoy is a small community in Amador County, California. It is near Jackson, CA and lies at an elevation of 1276 feet (389 m).
Bonnefoy was originally a gold mining community. Today, it is a small town made up of a collection of homes and an RV park. Bonnefoy has a population of about 40.

References

Unincorporated communities in California
Unincorporated communities in Amador County, California